James Liao may refer to:

 James Hiroyuki Liao (born 1985), American actor
 James C. Liao, synthetic biologist